The Badong Yangtze River Bridge is a cable-stayed bridge over the Yangtze River in Badong County, Hubei, China. Completed in July 2004, it carries 4 lanes of traffic on China National Highway 209.

See also
List of tallest bridges in the world
Yangtze River bridges and tunnels

External links
http://www.highestbridges.com/wiki/index.php?title=Badong_Yangtze_River_Bridge

References

Bridges in Hubei
Bridges over the Yangtze River
Cable-stayed bridges in China
Bridges completed in 2004
Badong County